Sparganothis unifasciana, the one-lined sparganothis moth, is a species of moth of the family Tortricidae. It is found in the northeastern United States and southeastern Canada.

The wingspan is about 18 mm. The forewings are yellow with an orangish-brown band and an orangish-brown blotch. The hindwings are pale grey. Adults are on wing in June and July.

References

Moths described in 1864
Sparganothis